Clio Cup China Series is a one-make series held in China that featured Renault Clio since 2009. Originally begun by Renault Sport in Europe, managed and organized by Formula Racing Development (FRD) in China, the Clio Cup China Series is a one-make racing series featuring the Clio supermini car.

Over the years, many experienced drivers from the region joined the race and even Hong Kong superstar Aaron Kwok once joined the series and won the Championship in 2009.

2013, there will be 10 rounds of Clio Cup China Series around China: there will be 4 races as one of the supporting race of 2013 CTCC. To popularise the Clio Race culture is a long-term mission of FRD, Clio Cup China Series provides a superb platform to share racing passion and culture for car owners and fans. Now, the Clio Cup China Series becomes an influential racing sport in China.

Race Format
Over the race weekend, there is 1 30-minute official practice session and 2 Qualifying sessions of 30 minutes each. 2 races with no less than 40 kilometers will be held with equal points for both races.
The race grid would be determined by its respective qualifying session. Which means Qualifying 1 will determine Race 1's grid and Qualifying 2 will determine Race 2's grid.

Current points system
Points are awarded to the top 20 drivers in each race as well as the driver(s) setting the fastest lap using the following system:

Champions

References

China Series
One-make series
Auto racing series in China